Fabresema cheesmanae is a moth of the subfamily Arctiinae. It was described by Jeremy Daniel Holloway in 1979. It is found in New Caledonia.

References

Lithosiini
Moths described in 1979